1811 in sports describes the year's events in world sport.

Boxing
Events
 Tom Cribb retains his English championship, defeating American Tom Molineaux on 28 September in the 11th round of a highly anticipated return bout.

Cricket
Events
 In time for the start of the 1811 season, Marylebone Cricket Club (MCC) reluctantly follows Thomas Lord to his new Middle Ground, the lease on the original Lord's Old Ground having expired.  MCC are resident at the Middle Ground for the next three years. 
 Only one first-class match is recorded as the Napoleonic War takes its toll of cricket's manpower and investment.
England
 Most runs – William Lambert 51
 Most wickets – Thomas Howard 8

Horse racing
England
 2,000 Guineas Stakes – Trophonius 
 The Derby – Phantom
 The Oaks – Sorcery
 St. Leger Stakes – Soothsayer

References

 
1811